Albert Frederick Strueve (June 26, 1860 – January 28, 1929) was a 19th-century professional baseball player.

External links

1860 births
1929 deaths
Major League Baseball catchers
St. Louis Browns (AA) players
19th-century baseball players
Evansville (minor league baseball) players
St. Joseph Reds players
Buffalo Bisons (minor league) players
Toledo Maumees (minor league) players
Baseball players from Ohio